Anolis heteropholidotus is a species of lizard in the family Dactyloidae. The species is found in Honduras and El Salvador.

References

Anoles
Reptiles of Honduras
Reptiles of El Salvador
Reptiles described in 1952
Taxa named by Robert Mertens